The FAI Gold Air Medal was established in 1924 by the Fédération Aéronautique Internationale and was first awarded in 1925. This award and the Paul Tissander Diploma are the FAI's two highest awards. It is reserved for those who have contributed greatly to the development of aeronautics by their activities, work, achievements, initiative or devotion to the cause of aviation.

Winners

See also

 List of aviation awards

References

External links
List of awards on FAI site

Aviation awards
Awards established in 1924
Fédération Aéronautique Internationale